The Dwaar Kill is a  tributary of the Shawangunk Kill in Ulster County, New York, in the United States.

The source of the Dwaar Kill is located in the Minnewaska State Park Preserve.

See also
List of rivers of New York

References

External links

Rivers of New York (state)
Rivers of Ulster County, New York
Shawangunks
Shawangunk, New York